The 1900 United States presidential election in Nevada took place on November 6, 1900. All contemporary 45 states were part of the 1900 United States presidential election. State voters chose three electors to the Electoral College, which selected the president and vice president.

Nevada was won by the Democratic nominees, former U.S. Representative William Jennings Bryan of Nebraska and his running mate Adlai Stevenson I of Illinois.

Bryan had previously defeated Republican William McKinley in the state four years earlier and would later defeat William Howard Taft in 1908. McKinley remains the most recent president to win two terms in the White House without carrying Nevada in either election.

Results

Results by county

See also
United States presidential elections in Nevada

Notes

References

Nevada
1900
1900 Nevada elections